Vokhid Shodiev (born 9 November 1986) is an Uzbek footballer who plays as a forward for FC Qizilqum Zarafshon.

Career
Shodiev in 2010–11 played for Neftchi Farg'ona. Since 2012  he plays for FK Buxoro. In 2013 season with 12 goals scored he was one of the top scorers of Uzbek League. On 6 November 2013 he was called up for Uzbekistan match of 2015 AFC Asian Cup qualification on 15 November 2013 against Vietnam.

His national team debut and goal was against Vietnam, 15 November 2013. His second goal came in his next match on 19 November 2013 at 2015 AFC Asian Cup qualification against Hong Kong.

On 10 December 2013 he signed a two-year contract with Bunyodkor. He played his first official and international match for Bunyodkor on 25 February 2014 in AFC Champions League match against Al-Fateh. On 7 March 2014 he scored his first goal in official matches for the club in UzPFL Super Cup match against Lokomotiv Tashkent.

He signed with Perak FA on 30 December 2015. He was released in June 2016 having scored 1 goal in 10 league matches.

On 26 July 2017, Shodiev re-signed for FC Bunyodkor.

Honours
 Uzbekistan Super Cup (1): 2013

Career statistics

Club

International
Goals for Senior National Team

References

External links

Vokhid Shodiev player info at Eurosport Australia
Vokhid Shodiev- Footballdatabase

1986 births
Living people
Uzbekistani footballers
Uzbekistani expatriate footballers
Buxoro FK players
Perak F.C. players
FC Bunyodkor players
FK Mash'al Mubarek players
Uzbekistan Super League players
Malaysia Super League players
People from Fergana
Uzbekistan international footballers
2015 AFC Asian Cup players
Association football midfielders
Footballers at the 2014 Asian Games
Expatriate footballers in Malaysia
Uzbekistani expatriate sportspeople in Malaysia
Asian Games competitors for Uzbekistan